Oued Laou (Berber: Asif en Law) is a small town located in northern Morocco on the Mediterranean coast. The two main cities nearby are Tetouan to the northwest and Chefchaouen at the southwest. In 2004 the town had 8,383 inhabitants.

Description
The town of Oued Laou draws its name from a small river, hence the name Oued, that empties in the Mediterranean.

The river is 65 km long and its headwaters are located near Bab Bered in the western Rif Mountains; it passes near Chefchaouen before receiving water from its tributaries such as Akchour. The average flow of the river is 12 m3/s and drains an area of about 1,000 km2.

Oued Laou was mentioned by Pliny the Elder as "flumen Laud" and described it as navigable: flumen Laud et ipsum navigiorum capax (river Laud, which is also navigable for vessels).

The river Laou forms a fertile valley as it approaches its mouth; the valley is known for its fruit orchards.

External links
 Pictures of a journey from Oued Laou to Chefchaouen

References and notes

Rivers of Morocco
Tétouan
Populated places in Tanger-Tetouan-Al Hoceima